William Dickenson "Wild Bill" Hunter,  (May 5, 1920 – December 16, 2002) was a Canadian ice hockey player, general manager and coach. Hunter was involved in hockey, Canadian football, baseball, softball and curling, but he is best known for founding the Western Hockey League (WHL), being a key player in the upstart World Hockey Association (WHA) and for his efforts to bring professional hockey to previously overlooked Western Canadian cities, especially in Edmonton and (unsuccessfully) in Saskatoon.

Early years
Hunter was born in Saskatoon, the first of ten children and founded his first competitive sports team when he was 18. Hunter's Saskatoon Dukes football club eventually became the Saskatoon Hilltops. Hunter then attended Notre Dame College in Wilcox, Saskatchewan, from 1938 to 1940, where he managed the college baseball team.

Following the outbreak of the Second World War Hunter left school to join the Royal Canadian Air Force and served for about four years as a pilot based in England. Hunter flew Beauforts, Spitfires and Hurricanes before returning to Saskatoon in 1944 where he worked briefly for CFQC Radio before opening Hunter's Sporting Goods in North Battleford the following year.

Between 1945 and 1949 Hunter coached and managed hockey teams in North Battleford, Regina, Moose Jaw and Yorkton. It was during these years that Hunter was nicknamed "Wild Bill" following a dispute with a referee. Hunter did not like the nickname especially at first, but it stuck with him for the rest of his life.

In 1950, Hunter founded the first curling bonspiel to be held on artificial ice, the Quaker Car Curling Bonspiel. He also managed and coached the Saskatoon Quakers hockey club until 1952. 

From 1953 to 1956, he was the owner, manager and coach of the Medicine Hat Tigers. In September 1956, Hunter claimed that he could rightfully sell players as the team owner. Alberta Amateur Hockey Association president Art Potter disagreed that any junior team owned its players, nor had the right to sell them to another team, and compared it to slavery. He warned that proper transfers must be completed to change teams, and that players could be suspended if an agreement was not honoured to play for a team.

Birth of the WHL
By 1965 Hunter was owner, general manager and coach of the Edmonton Oil Kings. The Oil Kings won the Memorial Cup in 1966, but by then Hunter was arguing that the competitive structure of the game in Western Canada was putting the region at a disadvantage to stronger leagues in Ontario and Quebec. Each western province still had its own junior league while Hunter believed the West needed a single elite junior league to compete effectively.

Following a dispute with the Saskatchewan Junior Hockey League president and with the support of several other owners, Hunter formed the Canadian Major Junior Hockey League in 1966, with Hunter becoming the first chairman of the board. The new "outlaw league" was not welcomed by everyone with open arms, and it would be a few years before the Canadian Amateur Hockey Association allowed its champion to compete for the Memorial Cup, but it soon proved too strong for the provincial leagues to ignore, and they soon stopped competing for the trophy. By 1972 the Memorial Cup's modern round-robin format was established—since then the WHL has won the Memorial Cup more times than any other league.

Birth of the Edmonton Oilers and the WHA
Following the establishment of what would become the WHL, Hunter turned his efforts toward professional hockey. The National Hockey League (NHL) was expanding but it was not interested in Hunter's proposal for an expansion franchise to play in Edmonton. Hunter offered to purchase the Pittsburgh Penguins, but this proposal was also rebuffed. In 1971, Hunter was introduced to Gary Davidson and Dennis Murphy, two promoters from the United States who were interested in establishing a rival league. On November 1, 1971, the Edmonton Oilers became one of the 12 founding WHA franchises, founded by "Wild Bill" and partner, Dr. Charles A. "Chuck" Allard (1919 – 1991) who, a decade later, also brought the SCTV sketch comedy TV series to Edmonton.

The World Hockey Association started play in 1972 with Hunter as co-owner, general manager and, by the halfway point, head coach of the Alberta Oilers, who were renamed the Edmonton Oilers the following season. Although the Oilers were a mediocre team on the ice, they were among the fledgling league's most financially stable franchises, especially after the completion of Northlands Coliseum in 1975. In 1976, Hunter and Allard sold the franchise to Nelson Skalbania, who made Peter Pocklington an equal partner, then sold him his shares a year later, two years before the Oilers joined the NHL in 1979.

Hunter served as the Edmonton Oilers' head coach during the 1972–73, 1974–75, and 1975–76 seasons. The franchise's mascot, Hunter, is named in his honour.

Saskatoon Blues

Hunter made one more serious attempt to bring a professional team to Western Canada when in 1983 he offered to purchase the financially struggling St. Louis Blues and move the team to his hometown. The offer raised many eyebrows even in Canada as few thought an NHL team could survive in a relatively small city. Nonetheless, Hunter was able to obtain commitments for 18,000 season tickets and an 18,000-seat arena. This did not prove sufficient for the NHL Board of Governors, who blocked the transaction even though doing so forced the league to take over the team itself.

The Blues were eventually sold to Harry Ornest, who kept the franchise in St. Louis.

However, Hunter's efforts did not prove completely fruitless, as the city eventually built Saskatchewan Place in 1988, although many Saskatonians felt the location chosen for the facility was inferior to the site Hunter had proposed for his centre. Following his death, the City of Saskatoon renamed a street near SaskTel Centre after Hunter.

Later years and death
Following his attempt to bring the Blues to Saskatoon, Hunter organized softball tournaments in Saskatoon before investing in the San Diego Gulls hockey club in 1990. He remained somewhat active in the 1990s, helping to organize the Flexi-Coil curling cashspiel in his hometown before his health began to fail.

Hunter died of cancer in Edmonton on December 16, 2002, and is interred at Holy Cross Cemetery.

Honours
He was made an Officer of the Order of Canada in 2000 and inducted into the Canadian Sports Hall of Fame in 2001.

In 2010, he was elected as an inaugural inductee into the World Hockey Association Hall of Fame in the builders category.

Coaching record

References

External links
Bill Hunter's Saskatchewan Sports Hall of Fame profile

1920 births
2002 deaths
Canadian sports businesspeople
Canadian sports executives and administrators
Canadian World War II pilots
Edmonton Oil Kings (WCHL) coaches
Edmonton Oilers coaches
Edmonton Oilers executives
Ice hockey people from Saskatchewan
Members of the Order of Canada
Western Hockey League
Sportspeople from Saskatoon
World Hockey Association coaches
World Hockey Association executives